Miriam Chytilová (born 21 June 1965) is a Czech actress and singer. She has dubbed the Czech voice for characters played by Jodie Foster, Romy Schneider, and Jennifer Aniston.

Partial filmography 

1973: Adam  Otka - Otka
1974: 30 případů majora Zemana (TV Series)
1975: Osvobození Prahy
1975: Chalupáři (TV Series) - Little girl
1975: Mys Dobré naděje - Gerta
1976: Čas lásky a naděje
1976: Borisek, malý seržant - Dívka
1976: Odysseus a hvězdy
1978: Jak se točí Rozmarýny - Renata
1978: Tajemství proutěného košíku (TV Series) - Klárka
1979: Indiáni z Větrova - Dite
1981: Muž přes palubu
1984: Amadeus
1984: Rubikova kostka (TV Movie)
1984: Bambinot (TV Series)
1985: Až do konce - svadlenka Marie
1985: Zátah
1986: Švec z konce světa (TV Movie) - Betka
1988: Případ se psem
1990: Dcera národa (TV Movie)
1990: Houpačka - Miska
1992: Osvětová přednáška v Suché Vrbici (TV Movie) - Irena
1993: Konec básníku v Cechách - Jeskynka (voice)
1994: Nevěra po císařsku (TV Movie)
1996: Kolja
2003: Nepodepsaný knoflík (TV Movie)
2005: Jasnovidec (TV Movie)

External links 
ČSFD.cz
Televize.cz
FDB.cz

Czech film actresses
Czech television actresses
Czech stage actresses
Czech voice actresses
Living people
1965 births
Actresses from Prague
20th-century Czech actresses
21st-century Czech actresses